Medics, also known under the original title Lekarze, is a Polish medical drama which aired from 3 September 2012 to 30 November 2014 on TVN.

Plot
The series follows the story of Alicja Szymańska (Magdalena Różczka), a young and ambitious surgeon, who starts to work in a fictional Copernicus hospital in Toruń. She meets a group of charismatic doctors, who fight for the life and health of their patients forgetting their own weaknesses and everyday problems.

Production
On 10 October 2011 it was announced that the network was working on a medical drama and the series would be shot in Toruń.
Filming of the first series consisting of 13 episodes began on 21 October 2011 under the production title Szpital Alicji (Alicja's Hospital) and ended on 3 April 2012 in Toruń. The title was changed on 12 March 2012 to Medics.  The series premiers on September 3, 2012. On 19 June 2012 it was announced that Medics had been renewed for a second season after receiving positive reviews from the network. Filming of the second season began on 17 July 2012 in Toruń, even before the first series' television premiere. The final scene was filmed on 20 November 2012 in Warsaw. On 9 November 2012 Medics was renewed for third season, which premiers this fall with 13-all new episodes. The cast will return to the set late April this year. On 6 March 2013 the medical series was renewed for one more season. The fourth season of the Medics will consist of 13 episodes and will premiere in spring 2014.

Cast
Magdalena Różczka as Alicja Szymańska, surgeon 
Paweł Małaszyński as Maks Keller, surgeon
Danuta Stenka as Elżbieta Bosak, chief of surgery
Jacek Koman as Leon Jasiński, surgeon
Katarzyna Bujakiewicz as Sylwia Matysik, ward nurse
Agnieszka Więdłocha as Beata Jasińska, anesthesiologist
Szymon Bobrowski as Piotr Wanat, gynaecologist
Piotr Polk as Krzysztof Florczyk, surgeon
Marcin Perchuć as Adam Gajewski Jivan, general practitioner
Wojciech Zieliński as Daniel Orda, surgeon
 Julia Krynke as Mira Ziemska

Series synopsis

Series One

Young and ambitious surgeon Alicja Szymańska (Magdalena Różczka)  decides to begin a new life. She leaves Warsaw and moves to Toruń, where she begins the job in a fictional hospital Copernicus managed by Elżbieta Bosak (Danuta Stenka). New job gives her the opportunity to develop her career and meet a group of full of passion doctors, who fight for life and health of their patients forgetting their own weaknesses and everyday problems.
Filming of the first series consisting of 13 episodes began on 21 October 2011 under the production title Szpital Alicji (Alicja's Hospital) and ended on 3 April 2012 in Toruń. The title was changed on 12 March 2012 for Medics.

Series Two
The second series was announced on 19 June 2012 after Medics received positive reviews from the network. The filming began on 17 July 2012 in Toruń and ended on 20 November 2012 in Warsaw. Season two started on 25 February. There will be 13 all-new episodes.

Series Three
On November 9 series Medics was renewed for another season. The filming started on 15 April 2013 and ended on 31 July 2013. Third season started on September 2, 2013 and ended on November 25th 2013. Season finale marks the first appearance of Wojciech Mecwaldowski. and his character Michał Karkoszka

Series Four
Medics on 6 March 2013 were renewed for fourth season, with 13 episodes to TVN in spring 2014. The cast returned on the set on 1 October 2013 and final scene was filmed on 26 February. Season premiere was on 2 March and finale will air on 25 May. Paweł Małaszyński left the show in season premiere. Wojciech Mecwaldowski is a series regular and Anna Polony is recurring.

Series Five
On 17 December 2013 Medics were renewed for fifth season. There will be 13 all-new episodes. The filming started on 14 May and ended on 2 September. The season premiere was on 7 September. Borys Szyc joins the cast as Przemysław Karski and Olga Bołądź as series regular in 5x07 as new neurosurgeon Anna Bogna Zaniewska. In the final minutes of the series finale Bartosz Porczyk made an appearance as mysterious ex-boyfriend of Olga Bołądź character Anna. His character would be a series regular in season 6.

Cancellation
On 8 November 2014 it was announced that series would not return for season six due to low ratings. Probably Olga Bołądź and Borys Szyc stayed as series regulars for series six. Bartosz Porczyk was added as series regular as a mysterious ex-boyfriend Marcin.

Ratings
Medics premiered on TVN on Monday, 3 September 2012 at 9:30 p.m. and attracted the audience of 2.94 million. It reached the share of 24.2% in group "16-49" and 23.6% among all viewers. It was the most watched program in its timeslot.

References

External links

Medics at filmpolski.pl

Polish medical television series
Polish drama television series
2012 Polish television series debuts
2010s Polish television series
TVN (Polish TV channel) original programming